Cambridge City Police was the territorial police force responsible for law enforcement in Cambridge, England, from 1836 to 1965. From its creation until April 1951 it was known as Cambridge Borough Police.
It subsequently merged with four other police forces to become what is known today as Cambridgeshire Constabulary.

History

1836–1851 

The Cambridge Borough Police was established on 21 January 1836 to police within the historic county of Cambridgeshire county boundary, much smaller then than they are today. At this time, the force employed just thirty police officers.

There were no other police forces outside the city proper until April 1851 when the Cambridgeshire Constabulary was established, initially employing a total of seventy officers. This new force prompted the name of the Cambridge Borough Police to change to 'Cambridge City Police'.

1851–1965 

On 31 March 1965, five police forces — Cambridge City Police, Isle of Ely Constabulary, Huntingdonshire Constabulary, Peterborough Combined Police and Cambridgeshire Constabulary — were united to form the Mid-Anglia Constabulary, headquartered in Brampton. The name changed on 31 March 1974 to form today's Cambridgeshire Constabulary following alterations to county boundaries.

See also

 Policing in the United Kingdom
 Cambridgeshire Fire and Rescue Service
 East of England Ambulance Service

References 

Defunct police forces of England
Local government in Cambridgeshire
1836 establishments in England
Government agencies established in 1836